The 2006 Grand Prix de Tennis de Lyon was a men's tennis tournament played on indoor carpet courts. It was played at the Palais des Sports de Gerland in Lyon, France, and was part of the International Series tournaments of the 2006 ATP Tour.It was the 20th edition of the tournament and took place from 23 October through 30 October 2006. Fourth-seeded Richard Gasquet won the singles title.

Finals

Singles

 Richard Gasquet defeated  Marc Gicquel 6–3, 6–1
 It was Gasquet's 3rd singles title of the year and the 4th of his career.

Doubles

 Julien Benneteau /  Arnaud Clément defeated  František Čermák /  Jaroslav Levinský 6–2, 6–7(3–7), [10–7] 
 It was Benneteau's only title of the year and the 2nd of his career. It was Clément's 3rd title of the year and the 10th of his career.

References

External links
 ITF tournament edition details

 
Grand Prix de Tennis de Lyon
Grand Prix de Tennis de Lyon